Inversive congruential generators are a type of nonlinear congruential pseudorandom number generator, which use the modular multiplicative inverse (if it exists) to generate the next number in a sequence. The standard formula for an inversive congruential generator, modulo some prime q is:
 
 

Period
The sequence  must have  after finitely many steps, and since the next element depends only on its direct predecessor, also  etc. The maximum possible period for the modulus q is q itself, i.e. the sequence includes every value from 0 to q − 1 before repeating.

A sufficient condition for the sequence to have the maximum possible period is to choose a and c such that the polynomial  (polynomial ring over ) is primitive. Any polynomial, primitive or not, that leads to a maximal-period sequence is called an inversive maximal-period (IMP) polynomial. Chou describes an algorithm for choosing the parameters a and c to get such polynomials.

Eichenauer-Herrmann, Lehn, Grothe and Niederreiter have shown that inversive congruential generators have good uniformity properties, in particular with regard to lattice structure and serial correlations.

Example
ICG(5, 2, 3, 1) gives the sequence 1, 0, 3, 2, 4, 1, 0, 3, 4, 2, 1, 0, ...

Compound inversive generator
The construction of a compound inversive generator (CIG) relies on combining two or more inversive congruential generators according to the method described below.

Let  be distinct prime integers, each . For each index j, 1 ≤ j ≤ r, let  be a sequence of elements of  periodic with period length
. In other words, .

For each index j, 1 ≤ j ≤ r, we consider , where  is the period length of the following sequence .

The sequence  of compound pseudorandom numbers is defined as the sum
 .
The compound approach allows combining inversive congruential generators, provided they have full period, in parallel generation systems.

Advantages of CIG
The CIG are accepted for practical purposes for a number of reasons.

Firstly, binary sequences produced in this way are free of undesirable statistical deviations. Inversive sequences extensively tested with variety of statistical tests remain stable under the variation of parameter.

Secondly, there exists a steady and simple way of parameter choice, based on the Chou algorithm that guarantees maximum period length.

Thirdly, compound approach has the same properties as single inversive generators, but it also provides period length significantly greater than obtained by a single inversive congruential generator. They seem to be designed for application with multiprocessor parallel hardware platforms.

There exists an algorithm that allows designing compound generators with predictable period length, predictable linear complexity level, with excellent statistical properties of produced bit streams.

The procedure of designing this complex structure starts with defining finite field of p elements and ends with choosing the parameters a and c for each inversive congruential generator being the component of the compound generator. It means that each generator is associated to a fixed IMP polynomial. Such a condition is sufficient for maximum period of each inversive congruential generator and finally for maximum period of the compound generator. The construction of IMP polynomials is the most efficient approach to find parameters for inversive congruential generator with maximum period length.

Discrepancy and its boundaries

The discrepancy computes the distance of a generator from a uniform one. A low discrepancy means that the sequence generated can be used for cryptographic purposes, and the first aim of the inversive congruential generator is to provide pseudorandom numbers.

Definition
For  arbitrary points  the discrepancy is defined by
,

From this definition, we can say that if the sequence  is perfectly random then its well distributed on the interval  then  and all points are in  so  hence
 but instead if the sequence is concentrated close to one point then the subinterval  is very small  and  so 
Then we have from the better and worst case: 
.

Notations
Some further notation is necessary.

Define

and                

Higher bound
Let  and  be integers.

Then the discrepancy of the points    satisfies

           ≤  +

Lower bound
The discrepancy of  arbitrary points  satisfies

      

These two theorems show that the CIG is not perfect because the discrepancy is greater strictly than a positive value but also the CIG is not the worst generator as the discrepancy is lower than a value less than 1.

There exist also theorems which bound the average  value of the discrepancy for Compound Inversive Generators and also ones which take values such that the discrepancy is bounded by some value depending on the parameters. For more details see the original paper.

See also
Pseudorandom number generator
List of random number generators
Linear congruential generator
Generalized inversive congruential pseudorandom numbers
Naor-Reingold Pseudorandom Function

References

External links
 Inversive Generators at the University of Salzburg.

Pseudorandom number generators